Zoran Sokolović (born 2 June 1965) is a Bosnian bobsledder. He competed at the 1984 Winter Olympics, representing Yugoslavia, and at the 1994 Winter Olympics and the 1998 Winter Olympics, representing Bosnia and Herzegovina.

References

1965 births
Living people
Yugoslav male bobsledders
Bosnia and Herzegovina male bobsledders
Olympic bobsledders of Yugoslavia
Olympic bobsledders of Bosnia and Herzegovina
Bobsledders at the 1984 Winter Olympics
Bobsledders at the 1994 Winter Olympics
Bobsledders at the 1998 Winter Olympics
Sportspeople from Sarajevo